The 2012–13 IFA Championship (known as the Belfast Telegraph Championship for sponsorship reasons) was the fifth season since its establishment after a major overhaul of the league system in Northern Ireland. The season began on 10 August 2012 and ended on 4 May 2013. From next season onwards, the league would be operated by the Northern Ireland Football League, which was taking over from the Irish Football Association (IFA) for the 2013–14 season.

In Championship 1, Ards were confirmed as the champions on 20 April 2013 after a 1–1 draw against Institute, securing promotion back to the top flight for the first time since the 2005–06 season. Warrenpoint Town finished as runners-up, and qualified for the promotion/relegation play-off against Donegal Celtic. The tie ended 2–2 on aggregate with Warrenpoint Town winning on the away goals rule to reach the top flight for the first time in the club's history. Donegal Celtic were relegated to next season's Championship 1. Earlier in the season, Newry City were wound up and their IFA membership was later terminated. All of their results were also expunged. As a result of Newry's expulsion from the league, only the club that finished in 13th, Tobermore United, was relegated from Championship 1, and there was no relegation from Championship 2.

In Championship 2, winners Knockbreda were promoted to Championship 1, along with runners-up Ballyclare Comrades. Chimney Corner finished bottom for the fourth successive season but were saved from relegation by Newry City's demise.

Team changes from 2011–12
Ballinamallard United were last season's winners of Championship 1, achieving promotion to the 2012–13 IFA Premiership. Carrick Rangers replaced them for this season's Championship 1, after finishing in 12th place in the previous season's Premiership. Newry City missed out on promotion as they finished as runners-up, but were defeated 3–2 by Lisburn Distillery in the promotion/relegation play-off.

Promoted from Championship 1 to IFA Premiership
 Ballinamallard United (1st in Championship 1)

Relegated from IFA Premiership to Championship 1
 Carrick Rangers (12th in IFA Premiership)

Promoted from Championship 2 to Championship 1
 Coagh United (1st in Championship 2)
 Dundela (2nd in Championship 2)

Relegated from Championship 1 to Championship 2
 Banbridge Town (13th in Championship 1)
 Glebe Rangers (14th in Championship 1)

Club dissolved
 Newry City

Championship 1

Stadia and locations

League table

Results
Each team plays every other team twice (once at home, and once away) for a total of 24 games.

Championship 2

Stadia and locations

League table

Results
Each team plays every other team twice (once at home, and once away) for a total of 30 games.

References

NIFL Championship seasons
North
2012–13 in Northern Ireland association football